Raziabad (also Romanized as Raẕīābād and Razīābād) is a village in Qaleh-ye Mozaffari Rural District, in the Central District of Selseleh County, Lorestan Province, Iran. At the 2006 census, its population was 190, in 36 families.

References 

Towns and villages in Selseleh County